In enzymology, a cystathionine gamma-synthase is an enzyme that catalyzes the formation of cystathionine from cysteine and an activated derivative of homoserine, e.g.:

O4-succinyl-L-homoserine + L-cysteine  L-cystathionine + succinate

In microorganisms, the activated substrate of this enzyme is O4-succinyl-L-homoserine or O4-acetyl-L-homoserine. Cystathionine gamma-synthase from plants uses L-homoserine phosphate instead.

This enzyme belongs to the family of transferases, specifically those transferring aryl or alkyl groups other than methyl groups.  The systematic name of this enzyme class is O4-succinyl-L-homoserine:L-cysteine S-(3-amino-3-carboxypropyl)transferase. Other names in common use include O-succinyl-L-homoserine succinate-lyase (adding cysteine), O-succinylhomoserine (thiol)-lyase, homoserine O-transsuccinylase, O-succinylhomoserine synthase, O-succinylhomoserine synthetase, cystathionine synthase, cystathionine synthetase, homoserine transsuccinylase, 4-O-succinyl-L-homoserine:L-cysteine, and S-(3-amino-3-carboxypropyl)transferase.  This enzyme participates in 4 metabolic pathways: methionine metabolism, cysteine metabolism, selenoamino acid metabolism, and sulfur metabolism.  It employs one cofactor, pyridoxal phosphate.

References 

 
 
 
 
 
 

EC 2.5.1
Pyridoxal phosphate enzymes
Enzymes of unknown structure